Symphony Towers is a 1.2-million-square-foot late modernist two-tower hotel and office complex located in the historic Financial District in downtown San Diego, California, on B Street. The mixed-use, high-rise building includes a 34-story office building with 530,000 square feet of rentable space, the 264-room Marriott Vacation Club Pulse San Diego, a five-level parking structure and the 2,255-seat Copley Symphony Hall. In addition, the penthouse floor houses the exclusive University Club, and the tower has a helipad on the roof.

Douglas P. Wilson, current chairman and C.E.O. of Douglas Wilson Companies (DWC), partnered with Charlton Raynd Ventures to develop the project which opened in 1989. In 1988, during the course of construction, the project stalled and was acquired by London & Edinburgh Investment, Inc, a subsidiary of London-listed London & Edinburgh Trust PLC. The construction was completed and the office building fully leased. The project was retained by LEI and Charlton Raynd as an investment for several years. Designed by Skidmore, Owings and Merrill, Symphony Towers is widely seen as one of Downtown's premier locations.

See also
List of tallest buildings in San Diego

References

External links 
Symphony Towers at IrvineCompany.com
Douglas Wilson Companies (DWC)at DouglasWilson.com
Douglas P. Wilson at DouglasWilson.com

Hotel buildings completed in 1989
Skyscraper hotels in San Diego
Office buildings completed in 1989
Skidmore, Owings & Merrill buildings
Skyscraper office buildings in San Diego